Gary of the Pacific is a 2017 New Zealand comedy film directed by thedownlowconcept, starring Josh Thomson, Megan Stevenson and David Fane.

Cast
 Josh Thomson as Gary
 Megan Stevenson as Chloe
 David Fane as Dad
 Taofi Mose-Tuiloma as Lani
 Matt Whelan as Nelson

Reception
Alex Casey of The New Zealand Herald rated the film 3 stars out of 5, writing that while the film "has enough in it to enjoy, but you can't help but sense at times that it is simply treading safe waters instead of taking the plunge."

Steve Kilgallon of Stuff rated the film 3 stars out of 5, rating that the film "bounces along pleasantly and doesn't outstay its welcome."

References

External links
 
 

New Zealand comedy films
2017 comedy films